Ghousenagar is a village in Yadadri Bhuvanagiri district of Telangana, India. It falls under Bhongir mandal. It is 10km from Bhongiri.

References

Villages in Yadadri Bhuvanagiri district